"Antidote" is a song by Swedish house music supergroup Swedish House Mafia in collaboration with Australian electronic music duo Knife Party. It was released on 16 December 2011 in the United States as the second single from the Swedish House Mafia compilation album, Until Now. The remix EP was released on 15 January 2012 for the UK digital download in the iTunes Store. "Antidote" was written by Swedish House Mafia members Axwell, Steve Angello and Sebastian Ingrosso, and Knife Party members (the members of the drum and bass band Pendulum) Rob Swire and Gareth McGrillen. The song contains vocals by Swedish American hip hop recording artist Adam Baptiste (also known as ADL), whose vocals are uncredited, co-written by Swedish songwriter Klas Åhlund.

Chart performance
In the United Kingdom, the song debuted at number four on the UK Singles Chart and number one on the UK Dance Chart with first-week sales of 46,757 copies. It is the Swedish House Mafia's fourth consecutive top 10 hit in the UK.

Music video
The music video was released via YouTube on 19 December 2011 in association with Vevo in two different versions (clean and explicit). Both videos feature a heist in a Japanese strip club, with certain people talking in Japanese. The explicit version contains violent and sexual scenes. The two videos are also cut differently, in the sense that the more graphic scenes are left out of the clean version of the video. Certain scenes are more understandable after watching the explicit version of the video.

The explicit video is filmed in first person as the protagonist and his gang put on masks and steal a briefcase in the strip club, shooting and killing many of their enemies. The protagonist escapes and gets into a van just before the driver is shot by the rival gang; the gang then shoots and presumably kills the protagonist.

Track listings

Charts

Weekly charts

Year-end charts

Certifications

Release history

References 

2011 songs
Swedish House Mafia songs
Songs written by Sebastian Ingrosso
Songs written by Rob Swire
Songs written by Axwell
Songs written by Steve Angello
Songs written by Adam Baptiste
Songs written by Klas Åhlund